National Route 327 is a national highway of Japan connecting Hyūga, Miyazaki and Aso, Kumamoto in Japan, with a total length of 97.5 km (60.58 mi).

References

National highways in Japan
Roads in Kumamoto Prefecture
Roads in Miyazaki Prefecture